Neustria was a passenger ship of the French Fabre Line. Neustria had a compound engine and single screw, one funnel, two masts, and a straight stem, and was of iron construction. She could carry 18 first-class passengers and 1,100 passengers in steerage. She was employed on the Marseille–New York City route with a stop in Spain. In the Spanish–American War during 1898, Spain used Neustria to bring back Spanish troops from Cuba.

According to The Statue of Liberty Ellis Island Foundation Website, the Neustria transported immigrants from Naples, Italy, via Marseilles to the Port of New York, from which they were ferried by barges to Ellis Island, from 1892 to 1908.

On October 27, 1908, Neustria sailed from New York to Marseille and vanished without a trace. She was not carrying any passengers at the time, but her entire crew of 38 was lost. Her wreck has never been found and her fate remains a mystery.

References

1890s ships
Ships built in France
Maritime incidents in 1908
Missing ships
Ships lost with all hands
Shipwrecks in the Atlantic Ocean